Tambar Springs is a town in the North West Slopes region of New South Wales, Australia.

Geography 

History 
Tambar Springs was opened up for grazing in the 1830s. Closer settlement began in 1868 and the village was proclaimed twenty years later in 1888.

It is thought to be the first World War I memorial built in New South Wales.

In addition, Tambar Springs also had the largest number of men per capita enlisted in the Australian Army, over both world wars.

Fossils 
Nearby Tambar Springs is a significant palaeontology site; a typical Pleistocene assemblage. Between 1979 and 1984, the Australian Museum excavated a complete Diprotodon skeleton as well as a pelvis and femur.

References

External links

Towns in New South Wales
Gunnedah Shire